was a town located in Maniwa District, Okayama Prefecture, Japan.

As of 2003, the village had an estimated population of 1,668 and a density of 24.83 persons per km². The total area was 67.19 km².

On March 31, 2005, Mikamo, along with the town of Hokubō (from Jōbō District), and towns of Katsuyama, Kuse, Ochiai and Yubara, and the villages of Chūka, Kawakami and Yatsuka (all from Maniwa District) were merged to create the city of Maniwa.

Geography
Rivers: Shinjō River (Tributary of the Asahi River)

Adjoining municipalities
Okayama Prefecture
Katsuyama
Yubara
Shinjō
Ōsa

Education
Mikamo Elementary School
Mikamo Junior High School

Transportation

Road
National highways:
Route 181
Prefectural roads:
Okayama Prefectural Route 55 (Yubara-Mikamo)
Okayama Prefectural Route 447 (Awadani-Mikamo)

External links
Official website of Maniwa in Japanese

Maniwa
Dissolved municipalities of Okayama Prefecture